The Matra M.04 was a French missile project that began development in  Societe Matra in 1948. Intended either as an air-to-air missile or a surface-to-air missile it was never adopted in service, although it was tested over the Sahara in 1952.

Development
The missile was first test-fired in flight from a Halifax bomber in May 1950 at Colomb-Bechar. The missile was large for an air-to-air missile, with two pairs of cruciform swept wings, with the smaller rear pair being moved using pneumatic actuation to provide steering. A SEPR acid/aniline rocket containing 110 kg of propellent provided 1,250 kg of thrust for 14 seconds, taking it to a speed of 490 meters per second.

The surface-to-air version was intended to have an additional tandem booster stage, and was designated the R.042 - and work continued on it until 1955.

References

 Flight magazine, 28 January 1955

M.004
Matra